Union de Transports Aériens (abbreviated as UTA and sometimes known as UTA French Airlines), was a French airline that was formed in 1963 as a result of a merger between Union Aéromaritime de Transport (UAT) and Transports Aériens Intercontinentaux (TAI). UTA was the largest wholly privately owned, independent airline in France. It was also the second-largest international, as well as the second principal intercontinental, French airline and a full member of the International Air Transport Association (IATA) since its inception.

The airline was a subsidiary of Compagnie Maritime des Chargeurs Réunis, the French shipping line founded and controlled by the Fabre family, but was absorbed into Air France between 1990 and 1992.

History

The decision to merge Union Aéromaritime de Transport (UAT) with Transports Aériens Intercontinentaux (TAI) was taken in September 1961, building on a commercial relationship between the two airlines that had begun in the early 1950s. UTA, the new company that succeeded UAT and TAI, came into being on 1 October 1963 with a capital of £2.6mn.

Formation and early years
At the time of its inception, UTA employed 4,900 personnel (including 630 aircrew) and inherited a fleet of 35 aircraft from its predecessors, comprising six jet aircraft and 29 piston engine airliners. These were progressively repainted in UTA's new livery, a combination of UAT's blue and TAI's green colour schemes. The inherited  network spanned five continents. Most of these were intercontinental, long-haul routes connecting France with West and Southern Africa. On 1 November 1963 UTA introduced DC-8 jets on its flights from Paris to Lagos, Accra, Monrovia and Freetown. UTA's creation coincided with a new French aviation policy that established exclusive spheres of influence for UTA and Air France. Air France withdrew from UTA's sphere of influence but UTA continued serving the African routes it inherited from UAT in association with Air Afrique. This included UTA taking the place of UAT in the joint revenue sharing agreement with Air Afrique. In addition, UTA continued providing commercial and technical assistance to Air Afrique on the same terms as UAT.

UTA had the largest African network of any European airline, flying to up to 25 destinations. Its busiest scheduled route was Paris—Abidjan, served daily in both directions. UTA primarily operated long-haul intercontinental scheduled services linking metropolitan France with most countries in francophone West and Central Africa, a number of countries in anglophone West and Southern Africa (including Ghana, Nigeria, Liberia, Sierra Leone, Malawi, Zambia and Zimbabwe), as well as Angola and Mozambique in lusophone Southern Africa, South Africa, Libya in North Africa, Malta, the Middle East (Bahrain and Oman), South Asia (Sri Lanka), Southeast Asia (Indonesia, Malaysia, Singapore), New Caledonia, Australia, New Zealand, Tahiti and Los Angeles. In addition, the airline had regional scheduled passenger traffic rights between Japan, New Caledonia and New Zealand, between South Africa and the French Réunion island in the Indian Ocean, as well as between Tahiti and the US West Coast.

Through most of its existence UTA was one of only four wholly privately owned, independent airlines outside of the US with a major, long-haul scheduled presence. Unlike its British, Canadian and Hong Kong independent contemporaries, for most of its existence UTA did not have a network of short-/medium-haul scheduled routes nor did it compete on any of its scheduled routes with Air France, the primary French flag carrier at the time. This made it an almost exclusively long-haul, intercontinental scheduled airline. It also made its scheduled route network complementary to Air France and Air Inter. (UTA and Air France used to co-ordinate their schedules at Los Angeles to enable passengers to connect between Air France's transatlantic and UTA's transpacific services.)

UTA during the 1980s

In 1986 the French government unexpectedly decided to relax its policy of neatly dividing traffic rights for scheduled air services between Air France, Air Inter and UTA, without any route overlaps between them. The regulatory framework governing France's air transport sector at the time dated from 1963. It had prevented the country's three main scheduled airlines from operating outside their respective spheres of influence and competing with each other. The French government's decision to adopt a less rigid interpretation of its policy gradually reversed both of these rules. It therefore enabled UTA to launch scheduled services to new destinations within Air France's sphere of influence, in competition with that airline, for the first time. Paris — San Francisco became the first route UTA served in competition with Air France non-stop from Paris. (Air France responded by extending some of its non-stop Paris – Los Angeles services to Papeete, Tahiti, which competed with UTA on the Los Angeles – Papeete sector.) UTA's ability to secure traffic rights outside its traditional sphere of influence in competition with Air France was the result of a successful campaign it had mounted to lobby its government to enable it to grow faster, thereby becoming a more dynamic and more profitable business. During that time, UTA also planned to launch a short-haul European feeder network, which was to be operated by its Aéromaritime subsidiary. In the event, these plans were scuppered by a long-running, bitter industrial dispute between UTA's management and the unions representing the majority of pilots at Aéromaritime as well as at UTA itself. The dispute was about the introduction of new, lower pay scales at Aéromaritime to prepare it for the competition it was likely to face at the hands of Europe's new breed of much lower cost, aggressively expanding independent airlines, as exemplified by UK-based Air Europe at that time. It lasted for the better part of a year from the end of 1988 until October 1989 and resulted in the grounding of both Aéromaritime and UTA during that period. UTA's plans for a European feeder network were also overtaken by its subsequent merger with Air France.

1986 was also the year UTA lost its monopoly on the Paris—Papeete route to Minerve, France's leading contemporary charter airline.

In 1988 French Transport Minister Michel Delebarre partially reversed the French government's relaxed policy on allocating traffic rights to the country's three main contemporary scheduled airlines when he decided to deny UTA the right to fly non-stop from Paris to Newark in direct competition with Air France. The aim was to protect Air France's position as the country's dominant scheduled carrier by making UTA a less attractive takeover target for its foreign rivals in the event of a merger. The French government feared that Air France's smaller size relative to British Airways, Lufthansa and the US giants as well as its fragmented long-haul network put it at a commercial disadvantage in a liberalised air transport market. Air France, Air Inter and UTA were therefore encouraged to co-operate rather than compete with each other.

On 12 January 1990 UTA, along with Air Inter and Air France itself, became part of an enlarged Air France group, which in turn became a wholly owned subsidiary of Groupe Air France. On 18 December 1992, UTA ceased to exist as a legal entity within Groupe Air France.

Air France's acquisition of UTA and Air Inter was part of an early 1990s French government plan to create a unified national carrier with the economies of scale and global reach to counter threats resulting from the liberalisation of the air transport market in the European Union (EU).

Corporate affairs
UTA's corporate head office was located in the 8th arrondissement of Paris. The head office of the Compagnie Aéromaritime d'Affrètement subsidiary was in Puteaux in Greater Paris.

Fleet

UTA and its subsidiaries operated the following aircraft types and sub-types throughout its 29-year existence:
 Beech 18
 Douglas DC-4
 Douglas DC-6
 Douglas DC-7
 Fokker F27 Friendship
 Sud-Aviation SE-210 Caravelle 10R
 Boeing 737-200
 Douglas DC-8-30/50 series
 Douglas DC-8-62/63 "Super Sixty" series
 McDonnell Douglas DC-10-30
 Boeing 747-200
 Boeing 747-300
 Boeing 747-400

Throughout most of this time, UTA's "mainline" fleet strength stood at about ten to twelve aircraft only. The airline's small fleet size was conditioned by the nature of its operations, i.e. as a long-haul carrier serving most of its routes as multi-stop sectors at low frequencies of less than one flight per day.

1965 marked the beginning of a re-engining programme that saw UTA's fleet of six DC-8 series 30 turbojets gradually converted to series 50 turbofan standard.

In order to facilitate the smooth introduction of the DC-10 into its fleet, UTA joined the KSSU aircraft maintenance consortium, whose founding members were KLM, Scandinavian Airlines (SAS) and Swissair.

In August 1981, UTA became the second customer to order the Boeing 747-300. It took delivery of the first aircraft to roll off Boeing's production line on 2 March 1983. The airline also had two Boeing 747-200s converted to 747-200 SUDs, thereby joining a select group of only two airlines that chose to have some of their 747-200s re-manufactured in this manner with the other air carrier being KLM.

UTA placed its first-ever order for Airbus aircraft in 1987. The order was for six four-engined Airbus A340-300 long-haul widebodied jets. It included an option on a further six aircraft. The aircraft on firm order were to be delivered between 1992 and 1994, at a rate of two planes per year. It was intended that the newly ordered A340s would replace the airline's ageing DC-10s as well as facilitate its future expansion into new long-haul markets from the early 1990s onwards.

In 1989, UTA also ordered Boeing's twin-engined 767 widebody on behalf of Aéromaritime. That order had a value of US$250mn. It was for three -300ER aircraft. Air France's acquisition of UTA in 1990 resulted in it inheriting two of Aéromaritime's three 767-300ERs, thereby itself becoming a 767 operator by default.

Fleet in 1970

Fleet in 1978

UTA also had one Boeing 747-200 on order at this time.
The Fokker Friendships and Boeing 737 were based out of La Tontouta Airport, New Caledonia and used on local Pacific services.
In addition, UTA's then subsidiary company Air Polynésie, based at Faa'a International Airport, Tahiti, had a fleet of three Fairchild F-27A Friendships, one Britten-Norman Islander, one de Havilland Canada Twin Otter series 200, and one de Havilland Twin Otter series 300.

(Source for the above fleet notes: UTA General Timetable 1/4/78 - 31/10/78)

Fleet in 1986

UTA employed 6,569 people at this time.

Destinations

Union de Transports Aériens served the following destinations when it operated:

Europe
France
Bordeaux (Bordeaux–Mérignac Airport)
Montpellier (Montpellier–Méditerranée Airport)
Lyon (Lyon–Saint-Exupéry Airport)
Marseille (Marseille Provence Airport)
Montpellier (Montpellier–Méditerranée Airport)
Nantes (Nantes Atlantique Airport)
Nice (Nice Côte d'Azur Airport)
Paris (Charles de Gaulle Airport)
Paris (Orly Airport)
Toulouse (Toulouse–Blagnac Airport)
Malta
Malta (Malta International Airport)

Africa
Angola
Luanda (Quatro de Fevereiro International Airport)
Benin
Cotonou (Cadjehoun Airport)
Botswana
Gaborone (Sir Seretse Khama International Airport)
Burkina Faso
Ouagadougou (Ouagadougou Airport)
Cameroon
Douala (Douala International Airport)
Central African Republic
Bangui (Bangui M'Poko International Airport)
Chad
N'Djamena (N'Djamena International Airport)
Congo
Brazzaville (Maya-Maya Airport)
Côte d'Ivoire
Abidjan (Port Bouet Airport)
Gabon
Libreville (Libreville International Airport)
Guinea
Conakry (Conakry International Airport)
Liberia
Monrovia (Roberts International Airport)
Malawi
Lilongwe (Kamuzu International Airport)
Mali
Bamako (Bamako–Senou International Airport)
Mauritania
Nouakchott (Nouakchott International Airport)
Mozambique
Maputo (Maputo International Airport)
Namibia
Windhoek (Windhoek International Airport)
Niger
Niamey (Diori Hamani International Airport)
Nigeria
Lagos (Murtala Muhammed International Airport)
Sierra Leone
Freetown (Lungi International Airport)
South Africa
Johannesburg (Jan Smuts International Airport)
Togo
Lomé (Lomé–Tokoin Airport)
Zaïre
Kinshasa (N'djili International Airport)
Zambia
Lusaka (Lusaka International Airport)
Zimbabwe
Harare (Harare International Airport)

Asia
Bahrain
Bahrain (Bahrain International Airport)
British Hong Kong
Hong Kong (Kai Tak Airport)
Indonesia
Jakarta (Soekarno–Hatta International Airport)
Japan
Tokyo (Narita International Airport)
Malaysia
Kuala Lumpur (Subang International Airport)
Oman
Muscat (Muscat International Airport)
Pakistan
Karachi (Jinnah International Airport)
Singapore
Singapore (Changi Airport)
Sri Lanka
Colombo (Bandaranaike International Airport)

Oceania
Australia
Sydney (Sydney Airport)
French Polynesia
Papeete (Faa'a International Airport)
New Caledonia
Nouméa (La Tontouta International Airport)
New Zealand
Auckland (Auckland Airport)

North America
United States
Los Angeles (Los Angeles International Airport)
New Jersey (Newark Liberty International Airport)
San Francisco (San Francisco International Airport)

Incidents and accidents
There were six recorded incidents/accidents involving UTA aircraft. Four of these involved the loss of aircraft and three the loss of lives.

 On 2 October 1964, a UTA Douglas DC-6B inherited from predecessor UAT (registration F-BHMS) crashed into Mt. Alcazaba near Granada, Andalusia, in Southern Spain. The doomed aircraft was operating the airline's scheduled sector from Palma de Mallorca, Balearic Islands, Spain, to Port Étienne (as Nouadhibou was known then), Mauritania. There were no survivors among the aircraft's 80 occupants (seven crew and 73 passengers).
 On 12 July 1972, a scheduled UTA flight en route from Abidjan, Côte d'Ivoire, to Paris was taken over by hijackers. There were two fatalities as a result of this incident.
 On 10 March 1984, a UTA DC-8-63PF (registration F-BOLL) flying from Brazzaville, Republic of Congo to Paris CDG with an intermediate stop at N'Djamena in Chad was destroyed, following two consecutive bomb explosions on board the aircraft while it was on the ground at N'Djamena Airport. There were no fatalities since all passengers and crew managed to evacuate the aircraft before the second explosion in the central baggage compartment tore the aircraft apart.
 On 16 March 1985, a UTA Boeing 747-3B3 (registration F-GDUA) was destroyed on the ground at Paris CDG when a fire was accidentally started while cleaning of the aircraft's cabin was in progress. (According to contemporary press reports, the fire was allegedly started by a cleaner who carelessly dropped a burning cigarette in one of the toilets.) The fire rapidly spread, engulfing the entire cabin in flames. This resulted in the aircraft's total destruction, which was subsequently written off. There were no injuries as a result of this incident.
 On 19 September 1989, UTA flight 772, a McDonnell Douglas DC-10-30 (registration N54629) operating the Brazzaville – N'Djamena – Paris CDG sector, was bombed 46 minutes after take-off from N'Djamena causing the aircraft to crash while flying over Niger. Investigations and court cases have implicated Libyan state actors in the bombing. All 156 passengers and 14 crew members on board perished. For nearly 20 years, this incident marked the deadliest air disaster involving a French-operated airliner, in terms of loss of life. As of June 2009, it ranks as the second-deadliest (see Air France flight 447) (This incident was briefly noted in Neil Peart's book The Masked Rider: Cycling in West Africa as he was on this flight just months prior.)

Notes and citations
Notes

Citations

References
 
  (various backdated issues relating to UTA, 1963–1990)
  (various backdated issues relating to UTA scheduled flight information, 1963–1990)

External links

 UTA – Defunct French airlines https://web.archive.org/web/20130327113642/http://www.uta-airlines.com/
 UTA – In Memoriam http://www.al-airliners.be/t-z/uta/uta.htm
 Aéromaritime (Compagnie Aéromaritime d'Affrètement) — In Memoriam http://www.al-airliners.be/a/aeromaritime/aeromaritime.htm
 France's independent flag carrier, Flight International, 24 June 1971, p. 945 http://www.flightglobal.com/pdfarchive/view/1971/1971%20-%201062.html
 France's independent flag carrier ..., Flight International, 24 June 1971, p. 946 http://www.flightglobal.com/pdfarchive/view/1971/1971%20-%201063.html
 France's independent flag carrier ..., Flight International, 24 June 1971, p. 947 http://www.flightglobal.com/pdfarchive/view/1971/1971%20-%201064.html
 Union de Transports Aériens (UTA) at the Aviation Safety Network Database http://aviation-safety.net/database/operator/airline.php?var=4692
 Union de Transports Aériens (UTA) timetable images http://www.timetableimages.com/ttimages/ut2.htm
 UTA French airlines uniforms 1987–1992 http://www.uniformfreak.com/1uta.html
 BBC news, 19 September 2003 - UTA 772: The forgotten flight (19 September 1989) http://news.bbc.co.uk/1/hi/uk/3163621.stm
 The New York Times, 18 June 1987, COMPANY NEWS – Order for Airbus https://query.nytimes.com/gst/fullpage.html?res=9B0DE2DB1E3BF93BA25755C0A961948260
 The New York Times, 19 January 1989, BRIEFS https://query.nytimes.com/gst/fullpage.html?res=950DEFDF1F3DF93AA25752C0A96F948260
 M.R. Golder, The Changing Nature of French Dirigisme – A Case Study of Air France, St. Edmund Hall, Oxford. Thesis, submitted Trinity term, 1997 http://homepages.nyu.edu/~mrg217/MA.pdf
 FT.com/Business Life, The Monday Interview, 30 September 2007 – Pilot who found the right trajectory (Financial Times interview with Jean-Cyril Spinetta, chairman of Air France-KLM group) http://www.ft.com/cms/s/e6c07ce8-6de8-11dc-b8ab-0000779fd2ac,Authorised=false.html?_i_location=http%3A%2F%2Fwww.ft.com%2Fcms%2Fs%2Fe6c07ce8-6de8-11dc-b8ab-0000779fd2ac.html&_i_referer=http%3A%2F%2Fwww.google.co.uk%2Fsearch%3Fhl%3Den
 FOTW Flags of the World – Chargeurs Réunis (Shipping company, France) http://fotw.fivestarflags.com/fr~hfcha.html
 Answers.com (Business and Finance) — Chargeurs International http://www.answers.com/topic/chargeurs-international?cat=biz-fin
 Air France (Airline, France) https://web.archive.org/web/20110629173337/https://www.fotw.info/flags/fr%24hfair.html

 
Defunct airlines of France
Airlines established in 1963
Airlines disestablished in 1992
French companies established in 1963
Companies based in Paris
French companies disestablished in 1992